Adhi may refer to:
 Adhi, Rawalpindi, a village in Punjab, Pakistan
 Adhi, Jalandhar, a village in Punjab, India
 Aadhi (disambiguation), several topics related to South India
 Adhi College of Engineering and Technology, in Chennai, India

See also 
 Adi (disambiguation)